The broad-billed moa, stout-legged moa or coastal moa (Euryapteryx curtus) is an extinct species of moa.

Taxonomy
A 2009 genetic study showed that Euryapteryx curtus and Euryapteryx gravis were synonyms. A 2010 study explained size differences among them as sexual dimorphism. A 2012 morphological study interpreted them as subspecies instead.

The cladogram below follows a 2009 analysis by Bunce et al.:

It was a ratite and a member of the lesser moa family.  The ratites are flightless birds with a sternum without a keel. They also have a distinctive palate.  The origin of these birds is becoming clearer as it is now believed that early ancestors of these birds were able to fly and flew to the southern areas that they have been found in.

Habitat and distribution
 
These moa lived in both the North and the South Islands of New Zealand, and on Stewart Island. Its habitat was in the lowlands (duneland, forest, shrubland, and grassland).

Behaviour and ecology
As of 2006, half of all complete or mostly complete moa eggs in museum collections are likely broad-billed moa specimens. Of the specimens traditionally given the name Euryapteryx gravis, the eggs has an average length of 205mm and width of 143mm, while the group traditionally assigned to the name Euryapteryx curtus had an average length of 122mm and width of 94mm.

Footnotes

References

External links
 Unmasking the secrets of the extinct moa.

Extinct flightless birds
Extinct birds of New Zealand
Late Quaternary prehistoric birds
broad-billed moa